The 2018 NCAA Division I women's volleyball rankings is a human poll designated to rank the top 25 women's college volleyball programs at the NCAA Division I level. The official rankings recognized by the National Collegiate Athletic Association (NCAA) are determined by the American Volleyball Coaches Association (AVCA), and have released rankings for this competition since 1982. The rankings are updated weekly at the beginning of the season and finalized at the conclusion of the 2018 NCAA Division I women's volleyball tournament.

Legend

AVCA Coaches Poll

References

December 2018 sports events in the United States
 
NCAA